Peter Garth Palumbo, Baron Palumbo (born 20 July 1935) is a property developer and art collector. Palumbo was the last chairperson of the Arts Council of Great Britain and a life peer. He sat as a Conservative in the House of Lords from 1991 to 2019.

Early life
Lord Palumbo is the son of Rudolph Palumbo, himself a major property developer, and his first wife Elsie Gregory. He was educated at Scaitcliffe, at Englefield Green, Surrey, and then at Eton College and studied law and jurisprudence at Worcester College, Oxford, where he graduated with a third-class degree.

Career

Notable property projects and homes
In the 1960s Palumbo commissioned Ludwig Mies van der Rohe to build a tower in London; although it was designed, it was never built.
 
In 1972 Palumbo bought Farnsworth House in the US (outside of Chicago), designed by Mies van der Rohe, to which Palumbo added the designer's furniture.  He also expanded the grounds of the house by purchasing adjacent properties and placed in them the work of sculptors including Anthony Caro and Richard Serra. Palumbo sold the property at auction to the National Trust for Historic Preservation in 2003. Palumbo also owns Kentuck Knob, a private house built by Frank Lloyd Wright in the Allegheny Mountains south of Pittsburgh, Pennsylvania; owned a unit in the 860–880 Lake Shore Drive Apartments in Chicago; and for a time owned Le Corbusier's Maisons Jaoul in Neuilly-sur-Seine, Paris.

In 1994 Palumbo demolished the Mappin & Webb building in the City of London and replaced it at No 1 Poultry, with a building designed by the British architect, Sir James Stirling, which was opened by the Governor of the Bank of England, Eddie George.

Arts
Palumbo was a trustee of the Tate Gallery from 1978 until 1985 and chairman of the gallery's foundation between 1986 and 1987.  He formerly served as a trustee for the Whitechapel Art Gallery and of the Natural History Museum.  He was chairman of the Serpentine Gallery's board of trustees. Margaret Thatcher appointed him chairman of the Arts Council of Great Britain from 1988 until 1994.

He was also the chancellor of the University of Portsmouth and the chairman of the Friends of Highgate Cemetery. He has been on the Board of Trustees of The Architecture Foundation. Palumbo was chair of the jury of the Pritzker Prize for Architecture.

Palumbo led the fundraising effort to resurrect and refurbish the Church of St Stephen Walbrook in London, a building by Sir Christopher Wren which had been badly damaged during The Blitz (in World War II) – the sculptor Henry Moore was commissioned by Palumbo to build a stone altar for the church. The former rector of St Stephen Walbrook and founder of The Samaritans, Dr Chad Varah, was also the family chaplain.

He was created a life peer, on nomination by Margaret Thatcher, on 4 February 1991 as Baron Palumbo, of Walbrook in the City of London, after the ward and street named after a former river and which is in the name of his redesigned church. He sat in the House of Lords until his retirement on 2 September 2019.

Personal life
Palumbo married Denia Wigram (the daughter of Lionel Wigram) in 1959 – together they had one son (James Palumbo), and two daughters.  They divorced in 1977.  After Denia died in 1986, he married Hayat Mrowa (daughter of the Lebanese newspaper publisher Kamel Mrowa, and ex-wife of businessman Ely Calil) with whom he had another son and two daughters.

Royal connections
Palumbo was a polo teammate of Charles III during his time as the Prince of Wales and the two were close until 1984 when the King publicly criticised Palumbo's plans by Mies van der Rohe near St Paul's Cathedral, with Charles describing it as "a glass stump" which, faced with opposition, were not realised.  In 1988, Palumbo became godfather to Princess Beatrice of York, the elder daughter of the Duke of York.

Arms

References

External links
 
 Official website
 Voting record at the Public Whip
 Restoration of St. Stephen Walbrook church

1935 births
Living people
English people of Italian descent
People educated at Eton College
People educated at Scaitcliffe School
Alumni of Worcester College, Oxford
Conservative Party (UK) life peers
Life peers created by Elizabeth II
People associated with the University of Portsmouth
English socialites
Peter